The observable universe is a ball-shaped region of the universe comprising all matter that can be observed from Earth or its space-based telescopes and exploratory probes at the present time, because the electromagnetic radiation from these objects has had time to reach the Solar System and Earth since the beginning of the cosmological expansion. There may be 2 trillion galaxies in the observable universe, although that number was reduced in 2021 to only several hundred billion based on data from New Horizons. Assuming the universe is isotropic, the distance to the edge of the observable universe is roughly the same in every direction. That is, the observable universe is a spherical region centered on the observer. Every location in the universe has its own observable universe, which may or may not overlap with the one centered on Earth.

The word observable in this sense does not refer to the capability of modern technology to detect light or other information from an object, or whether there is anything to be detected. It refers to the physical limit created by the speed of light itself. No signal can travel faster than light, hence there is a maximum distance (called the particle horizon) beyond which nothing can be detected, as the signals could not have reached us yet. Sometimes astrophysicists distinguish between the visible universe, which includes only signals emitted since recombination (when hydrogen atoms were formed from protons and electrons and photons were emitted)—and the observable universe, which includes signals since the beginning of the cosmological expansion (the Big Bang in traditional physical cosmology, the end of the inflationary epoch in modern cosmology).

According to calculations, the current comoving distance—proper distance, which takes into account that the universe has expanded since the light was emitted—to particles from which the cosmic microwave background radiation (CMBR) was emitted, which represents the radius of the visible universe, is about 14.0 billion parsecs (about 45.7 billion light-years), while the comoving distance to the edge of the observable universe is about 14.3 billion parsecs (about 46.6 billion light-years), about 2% larger. The radius of the observable universe is therefore estimated to be about 46.5 billion light-years and its diameter about 28.5 gigaparsecs (93 billion light-years, or ), which equals 880 yottametres. Using the critical density and the diameter of the observable universe, the total mass of ordinary matter in the universe can be calculated to be about 1.5 × 1053 kg. In November 2018, astronomers reported that the extragalactic background light (EBL) amounted to 4 × 1084 photons.

As the universe's expansion is accelerating, all currently observable objects, outside the local supercluster, will eventually appear to freeze in time, while emitting progressively redder and fainter light. For instance, objects with the current redshift z from 5 to 10 will remain observable for no more than 4–6 billion years. In addition, light emitted by objects currently situated beyond a certain comoving distance (currently about 19 billion parsecs) will never reach Earth.

The universe versus the observable universe 

The size of the whole universe is unknown, and it might be infinite in extent. Some parts of the universe are too far away for the light emitted since the Big Bang to have had enough time to reach Earth or space-based instruments, and therefore lie outside the observable universe. In the future, light from distant galaxies will have had more time to travel, so one might expect that additional regions will become observable. However, owing to Hubble's law, regions sufficiently distant from the Earth are expanding away from it faster than the speed of light and furthermore the expansion rate appears to be accelerating owing to dark energy.

Assuming dark energy remains constant (an unchanging cosmological constant), so that the expansion rate of the universe continues to accelerate, there is a "future visibility limit" beyond which objects will never enter the observable universe at any time in the infinite future, because light emitted by objects outside that limit could never reach the Earth. (A subtlety is that, because the Hubble parameter is decreasing with time, there can be cases where a galaxy that is receding from the Earth just a bit faster than light does emit a signal that reaches the Earth eventually.) This future visibility limit is calculated at a comoving distance of 19 billion parsecs (62 billion light-years), assuming the universe will keep expanding forever, which implies the number of galaxies that we can ever theoretically observe in the infinite future (leaving aside the issue that some may be impossible to observe in practice due to redshift, as discussed in the following paragraph) is only larger than the number currently observable by a factor of 2.36.

Though, in principle, more galaxies will become observable in the future, in practice, an increasing number of galaxies will become extremely redshifted due to ongoing expansion; so much so that they will seem to disappear from view and become invisible. An additional subtlety is that a galaxy at a given comoving distance is defined to lie within the "observable universe" if we can receive signals emitted by the galaxy at any age in its past history (say, a signal sent from the galaxy only 500 million years after the Big Bang), but because of the universe's expansion, there may be some later age at which a signal sent from the same galaxy can never reach the Earth at any point in the infinite future (so, for example, we might never see what the galaxy looked like 10 billion years after the Big Bang), even though it remains at the same comoving distance (comoving distance is defined to be constant with time—unlike proper distance, which is used to define recession velocity due to the expansion of space), which is less than the comoving radius of the observable universe. This fact can be used to define a type of cosmic event horizon whose distance from the Earth changes over time. For example, the current distance to this horizon is about 16 billion light-years, meaning that a signal from an event happening at present can eventually reach the Earth in the future if the event is less than 16 billion light-years away, but the signal will never reach the Earth if the event is more than 16 billion light-years away.

Both popular and professional research articles in cosmology often use the term "universe" to mean "observable universe". This can be justified on the grounds that we can never know anything by direct experimentation about any part of the universe that is causally disconnected from the Earth, although many credible theories require a total universe much larger than the observable universe. No evidence exists to suggest that the boundary of the observable universe constitutes a boundary on the universe as a whole, nor do any of the mainstream cosmological models propose that the universe has any physical boundary in the first place, though some models propose it could be finite but unbounded, like a higher-dimensional analogue of the 2D surface of a sphere that is finite in area but has no edge.

It is plausible that the galaxies within the observable universe represent only a minuscule fraction of the galaxies in the universe. According to the theory of cosmic inflation initially introduced by its founders, Alan Guth and D. Kazanas, if it is assumed that inflation began about 10−37 seconds after the Big Bang, then with the plausible assumption that the size of the universe before the inflation occurred was approximately equal to the speed of light times its age, that would suggest that at present the entire universe's size is at least  light-years—at least  times the radius of the observable universe.

If the universe is finite but unbounded, it is also possible that the universe is smaller than the observable universe. In this case, what we take to be very distant galaxies may actually be duplicate images of nearby galaxies, formed by light that has circumnavigated the universe. It is difficult to test this hypothesis experimentally because different images of a galaxy would show different eras in its history, and consequently might appear quite different. Bielewicz et al. claim to establish a lower bound of 27.9 gigaparsecs (91 billion light-years) on the diameter of the last scattering surface (since this is only a lower bound, since the whole universe is possibly much larger, even infinite). This value is based on matching-circle analysis of the WMAP 7 year data. This approach has been disputed.

Size 

The comoving distance from Earth to the edge of the observable universe is about 14.26 gigaparsecs (46.5 billion light-years or ) in any direction. The observable universe is thus a sphere with a diameter of about 28.5 gigaparsecs (93 billion light-years or ).

The figures quoted above are distances now (in cosmological time), not distances at the time the light was emitted. For example, the cosmic microwave background radiation that we see right now was emitted at the time of photon decoupling, estimated to have occurred about  years after the Big Bang, which occurred around 13.8 billion years ago. This radiation was emitted by matter that has, in the intervening time, mostly condensed into galaxies, and those galaxies are now calculated to be about 46 billion light-years from us. To estimate the distance to that matter at the time the light was emitted, we may first note that according to the Friedmann–Lemaître–Robertson–Walker metric, which is used to model the expanding universe, if at the present time we receive light with a redshift of z, then the scale factor at the time the light was originally emitted is given by

.

WMAP nine-year results combined with other measurements give the redshift of photon decoupling as z = , which implies that the scale factor at the time of photon decoupling would be . So if the matter that originally emitted the oldest cosmic microwave background (CMBR) photons has a present distance of 46 billion light-years, then at the time of decoupling when the photons were originally emitted, the distance would have been only about 42 million light-years.

The light-travel distance to the edge of the observable universe is the age of the universe times the speed of light, 13.8 billion light years. This is the distance that a photon emitted shortly after the Big Bang, such as one from the cosmic microwave background, has travelled to reach observers on Earth. Because spacetime is curved, corresponding to the expansion of space, this distance does not correspond to the true distance at any moment in time.

Large-scale structure

Sky surveys and mappings of the various wavelength bands of electromagnetic radiation (in particular 21-cm emission) have yielded much information on the content and character of the universe's structure. The organization of structure appears to follow a hierarchical model with organization up to the scale of superclusters and filaments. Larger than this (at scales between 30 and 200 megaparsecs), there seems to be no continued structure, a phenomenon that has been referred to as the End of Greatness.

Walls, filaments, nodes, and voids 

The organization of structure arguably begins at the stellar level, though most cosmologists rarely address astrophysics on that scale.  Stars are organized into galaxies, which in turn form galaxy groups, galaxy clusters, superclusters, sheets, walls and filaments, which are separated by immense voids, creating a vast foam-like structure sometimes called the "cosmic web". Prior to 1989, it was commonly assumed that virialized galaxy clusters were the largest structures in existence, and that they were distributed more or less uniformly throughout the universe in every direction. However, since the early 1980s, more and more structures have been discovered. In 1983, Adrian Webster identified the Webster LQG, a large quasar group consisting of 5 quasars. The discovery was the first identification of a large-scale structure, and has expanded the information about the known grouping of matter in the universe.

In 1987, Robert Brent Tully identified the Pisces–Cetus Supercluster Complex, the galaxy filament in which the Milky Way resides. It is about 1 billion light-years across. That same year, an unusually large region with a much lower than average distribution of galaxies was discovered, the Giant Void, which measures 1.3 billion light-years across. Based on redshift survey data, in 1989 Margaret Geller and John Huchra discovered the "Great Wall", a sheet of galaxies more than 500 million light-years long and 200 million light-years wide, but only 15 million light-years thick. The existence of this structure escaped notice for so long because it requires locating the position of galaxies in three dimensions, which involves combining location information about the galaxies with distance information from redshifts.
Two years later, astronomers Roger G. Clowes and Luis E. Campusano discovered the Clowes–Campusano LQG, a large quasar group measuring two billion light-years at its widest point which was the largest known structure in the universe at the time of its announcement. In April 2003, another large-scale structure was discovered, the Sloan Great Wall. In August 2007, a possible supervoid was detected in the constellation Eridanus. It coincides with the 'CMB cold spot', a cold region in the microwave sky that is highly improbable under the currently favored cosmological model. This supervoid could cause the cold spot, but to do so it would have to be improbably big, possibly a billion light-years across, almost as big as the Giant Void mentioned above.

Another large-scale structure is the SSA22 Protocluster, a collection of galaxies and enormous gas bubbles that measures about 200 million light-years across.

In 2011, a large quasar group was discovered, U1.11, measuring about 2.5 billion light-years across. On January 11, 2013, another large quasar group, the Huge-LQG, was discovered, which was measured to be four billion light-years across, the largest known structure in the universe at that time. In November 2013, astronomers discovered the Hercules–Corona Borealis Great Wall, an even bigger structure twice as large as the former. It was defined by the mapping of gamma-ray bursts.

In 2021, the American Astronomical Society announced the detection of the Giant Arc; a crescent-shaped string of galaxies that span 3.3 billion light years in length, located 9.2 billion light years from Earth in the constellation Boötes from observations captured by the Sloan Digital Sky Survey.

End of Greatness
The End of Greatness is an observational scale discovered at roughly 100 Mpc (roughly 300 million light-years) where the lumpiness seen in the large-scale structure of the universe is homogenized and isotropized in accordance with the Cosmological Principle. At this scale, no pseudo-random fractalness is apparent.
The superclusters and filaments seen in smaller surveys are randomized to the extent that the smooth distribution of the universe is visually apparent. It was not until the redshift surveys of the 1990s were completed that this scale could accurately be observed.

Observations

Another indicator of large-scale structure is the 'Lyman-alpha forest'. This is a collection of absorption lines that appear in the spectra of light from quasars, which are interpreted as indicating the existence of huge thin sheets of intergalactic (mostly hydrogen) gas. These sheets appear to collapse into filaments, which can feed galaxies as they grow where filaments either cross or are overdense. An early direct evidence for this cosmic web of gas was the 2019 detection, by astronomers from the RIKEN Cluster for Pioneering Research in Japan and Durham University in the U.K., of light from the very brightest part of this web, surrounding and illuminated by a cluster of forming galaxies, acting as cosmic flashlights for intercluster medium hydrogen fluorescence via Lyman-alpha emissions.

In 2021, an international team, headed by Roland Bacon from the Centre de Recherche Astrophysique de Lyon, reported the first observation of diffuse extended Lyman-alpha emission from redshift 3.1 to 4.5 that traced several cosmic web filaments on scales of 2.5−4 cMpc, in filamentary environments outside massive structures typical of web nodes.

Some caution is required in describing structures on a cosmic scale because things are often different from how they appear. Gravitational lensing (bending of light by gravitation) can make an image appear to originate in a different direction from its real source. This is caused when foreground objects (such as galaxies) curve surrounding spacetime (as predicted by general relativity), and deflect passing light rays. Rather usefully, strong gravitational lensing can sometimes magnify distant galaxies, making them easier to detect. Weak lensing (gravitational shear) by the intervening universe in general also subtly changes the observed large-scale structure.

The large-scale structure of the universe also looks different if one only uses redshift to measure distances to galaxies. For example, galaxies behind a galaxy cluster are attracted to it, and so fall towards it, and so are slightly blueshifted (compared to how they would be if there were no cluster). On the near side, things are slightly redshifted. Thus, the environment of the cluster looks somewhat squashed if using redshifts to measure distance. An opposite effect works on the galaxies already within a cluster: the galaxies have some random motion around the cluster center, and when these random motions are converted to redshifts, the cluster appears elongated. This creates a "finger of God"—the illusion of a long chain of galaxies pointed at the Earth.

Cosmography of Earth's cosmic neighborhood
At the centre of the Hydra–Centaurus Supercluster, a gravitational anomaly called the Great Attractor affects the motion of galaxies over a region hundreds of millions of light-years across. These galaxies are all redshifted, in accordance with Hubble's law. This indicates that they are receding from us and from each other, but the variations in their redshift are sufficient to reveal the existence of a concentration of mass equivalent to tens of thousands of galaxies.

The Great Attractor, discovered in 1986, lies at a distance of between 150 million and 250 million light-years (250 million is the most recent estimate), in the direction of the Hydra and Centaurus constellations. In its vicinity there is a preponderance of large old galaxies, many of which are colliding with their neighbours, or radiating large amounts of radio waves.

In 1987, astronomer R. Brent Tully of the University of Hawaii's Institute of Astronomy identified what he called the Pisces–Cetus Supercluster Complex, a structure one billion light-years long and 150 million light-years across in which, he claimed, the Local Supercluster was embedded.

Mass of ordinary matter
The mass of the observable universe is often quoted as 1050 tons or 1053 kg. In this context, mass refers to ordinary matter and includes the interstellar medium (ISM) and the intergalactic medium (IGM). However, it excludes dark matter and dark energy. This quoted value for the mass of ordinary matter in the universe can be estimated based on critical density. The calculations are for the observable universe only as the volume of the whole is unknown and may be infinite.

Estimates based on critical density
Critical density is the energy density for which the universe is flat. If there is no dark energy, it is also the density for which the expansion of the universe is poised between continued expansion and collapse. From the Friedmann equations, the value for  critical density, is:

The value for H0, due to the European Space Agency's Planck Telescope, is H0 = 67.15 kilometres per second per megaparsec. This density includes four significant types of energy/mass: ordinary matter (4.8%), neutrinos (0.1%), cold dark matter (26.8%), and dark energy (68.3%). Although neutrinos are Standard Model particles, they are listed separately because they are ultra-relativistic and hence behave like radiation rather than like matter. To convert this density to mass we must multiply by volume, a value based on the radius of the "observable universe". Since the universe has been expanding for 13.8 billion years, the comoving distance (radius) is now about 46.6 billion light-years.

Matter content—number of atoms

The result is approximately 1080 hydrogen atoms, also known as the Eddington number.

Most distant objects

The most distant astronomical object identified (as of 2022) is a galaxy classified as HD1, with a redshift of 13.27, corresponding to a distance of about 33.4 billion light years. In 2009, a gamma ray burst, GRB 090423, was found to have a redshift of 8.2, which indicates that the collapsing star that caused it exploded when the universe was only 630 million years old. The burst happened approximately 13 billion years ago, so a distance of about 13 billion light-years was widely quoted in the media (or sometimes a more precise figure of 13.035 billion light-years), though this would be the "light travel distance" (see Distance measures (cosmology)) rather than the "proper distance" used in both Hubble's law and in defining the size of the observable universe (cosmologist Ned Wright argues against the common use of light travel distance in astronomical press releases on this page, and at the bottom of the page offers online calculators that can be used to calculate the current proper distance to a distant object in a flat universe based on either the redshift z or the light travel time). The proper distance for a redshift of 8.2 would be about 9.2 Gpc, or about 30 billion light-years.

Horizons

The limit of observability in the universe is set by a set of cosmological horizons which limit—based on various physical constraints—the extent to which we can obtain information about various events in the universe. The most famous horizon is the particle horizon which sets a limit on the precise distance that can be seen due to the finite age of the universe. Additional horizons are associated with the possible future extent of observations (larger than the particle horizon owing to the expansion of space), an "optical horizon" at the surface of last scattering, and associated horizons with the surface of last scattering for neutrinos and gravitational waves.

See also

Notes

References

Further reading

External links

 "Millennium Simulation" of structure forming – Max Planck Institute of Astrophysics, Garching, Germany
 
 Cosmology FAQ
 Forming Galaxies Captured In The Young Universe By Hubble, VLT & Spitzer
 Animation of the cosmic light horizon
 Inflation and the Cosmic Microwave Background by Charles Lineweaver
 Logarithmic Maps of the Universe
 List of publications of the 2dF Galaxy Redshift Survey
 The Universe Within 14 Billion Light Years – NASA Atlas of the Universe – Note, this map only gives a rough cosmographical estimate of the expected distribution of superclusters within the observable universe; very little actual mapping has been done beyond a distance of one billion light-years.
 Video: The Known Universe, from the American Museum of Natural History
 NASA/IPAC Extragalactic Database
 Cosmography of the Local Universe at irfu.cea.fr (17:35) (arXiv)
 There are about 1082 atoms in the observable universe – LiveScience, July 2021.
 Limits to knowledge about Universe – Forbes, May 2019.

Physical cosmology
Concepts in astronomy